Sufyan al-Thawri (716–778) was a Tābi‘ al-Tābi‘īn Islamic scholar, jurist, and founder of the Thawri madhhab. He was also a great hadith compiler (muhaddith) and was known as one of the Eight Ascetics.

Biography
Sufyan ath-Thawri was born in Khorosan. His nisba al-Thawri is derived from his ancestor Thawr b. 'Abd Manat. He moved to Kufa, Iraq, for his education and in his youth supported the Family of Ali ibn Abi Talib against the dying Umayyad caliphate. By 748 he had moved to Basra, "where he met ['Abdallah] ibn 'Awn and Ayyub [al-Sakhtiyani]. He then abandoned his Shi'i view." Afterwards, he stopped narrating the merits of Ali because he hated them in relation to the Shiites and advised other people to stop narrating the virtues of Ali so the people do not become "corrupted". It is said that the Umayyads offered him high office positions, but that he consistently declined. He even refused to give to the Caliphs moral and religious advice and when asked why, he responded "When the sea overflows, who can dam it up?". He was also quoted to have said to a friend of his "Beware of the rulers, of drawing close to and associating with them. Do not be deceived by being told that you can drive inequity away. All this is the deceit of the devil, which the wicked qurra' have taken as a ladder [to self promotion]."

Ath-Thawri's jurisprudential thought (usul al-fiqh), after his move to Basra, became more closely aligned to that of the Umayyads and of al-Awza'i. He is reported to have regarded the jihad as an obligation only as a defensive war.

Ath-Thawri was one of the 'Eight Ascetics,' who included (usual list) Amir ibn Abd al-Qays, Abu Muslim al-Khawlani, Uways al-Qarani, al-Rabi ibn Khuthaym, al-Aswad ibn Yazid, Masruq ibn al-Ajda', and Hasan al-Basri.

Ibn Qayyim al-Jawziyya relates in Madarij al-salikin, and Ibn al-Jawzi in the chapter entitled "Abu Hashim al-Zahid" in his Sifat al-safwa after the early hadith master Abu Nu`aym in his Hilyat al-awliya, that Sufyan al-Thawri said:

If it were not for Abu Hashim al-Sufi (d. 115) I would have never perceived the presence of the subtlest forms of hypocrisy in the self... Among the best of people is the Sufi learned in jurisprudence.

Ibn al-Jawzi also narrates the following:

Abu Hashim al-Zahid said: "Allah has stamped alienation upon the world in order that the friendly company of the murideen (seekers) consist solely in being with Him and not with the world, and in order that those who obey Him come to Him by means of avoiding the world. The People of Knowledge of Allah (ahl al-ma`rifa billah) are strangers in the world and long for the hereafter."

He spent the last year of his life hiding after a dispute between him and the caliph al-Mahdi. On his death the Thawri madhhab was taken up by his students, including Yahya al-Qattan. His school did not survive, but his juridical thought and especially hadith transmission are highly regarded in Islam, and have influenced all the major schools.

Stories of Sufyan ath-Thawri were also collected in Fariduddin Attar's Tadhkirat al-Awliya, a collection of Sufi hagiographies compiled in the twelfth/thirteenth century.

Works
Of his books, perhaps best known is his Tafsir of the Qur'an, one of the earliest in the genre. An Indian MSS purports to preserve it up to Q. 52:13, as published by Imtiyâz ʿAlî ʿArshî in 1965; also Tabari's tafsir quotes extensively from the whole text. He also preserved the books of his Umayyad predecessors.

It was reported that Sufyan al-Thawri was of the view that jihad was only obligatory in the case of defensive warfare, although this opinion has not been authentically traced to him.

See also
 List of Sufis
 Abu Sulayman al-Darani

References

External links
 Biodata at MuslimScholars.info

Al-Thawri, Sufyan
Muslim ascetics
Sunni Sufis
People from Kufa
8th-century Arabs
Arab writers
Hadith compilers
Hadith scholars
Taba‘ at-Tabi‘in hadith narrators
Scholars from the Umayyad Caliphate
8th-century jurists
716 births
Al-Thawri, Sufyan